The Fort Churchill Solar Array is a 19.9 megawatt (MWAC) concentrator photovoltaics power station near the city of Yerington in Lyon County, Nevada. It is the largest assembly of SunPower C7 tracker low concentration PV (LCPV) technology in the United States.  The facility was constructed for Apple Inc. to service its Reno Technology Park Data Center.

Project details 

The project occupies 137 acres adjacent to NV Energy's 226 MW natural gas-fueled Fort Churchill Generating Station in the Mason Valley.  SunPower constructed the project using 1,248 of its second-generation, single-axis C7 tracker systems.  The system reflects direct sunlight in order to concentrate it by a factor of seven onto high-efficiency (22.8% at 7x concentration) mono-crystalline silicon solar cells.

Apple initiated the project with Sunpower and NV Energy to supply its growing data center business in the state with 100% renewable energy. The resulting arrangement is unusual in that Apple owns the facility, leases it to NV Energy to operate and maintain under a 20-year contract,  then repurchases the power through the NV GreenEnergy Rider opportunity.

Electricity production

LCPV technology commercialization 

SunPower's proprietary high-efficiency solar cell technology, marketed under the "Maxeon" trademark, was originally developed to meet the more rigorous demands of LCPV, despite ultimately having a much greater success in the flat-panel PV market in the U.S.  Among the features, copper is deposited on the back of the cells to lower electrical and thermal resistances; thus mitigating the risks from concentrator "hotspots" and improving reliability.  In late 2011,  SunPower announced that its C7 concentrator system technology could reduce the levelized cost of electricity relative to competing 'utility-scale' PV installations available at the time by 20%.

In a strategic effort to achieve cost reductions at manufacturing scale - reductions similar to those rapidly being realized by commoditized PV using less efficient technology - SunPower entered a joint venture (JV) with the Chinese firm Tianjin Zhonghuan Semiconductor (TZS) to ramp-up LCPV production in late 2012.  In early 2014, SunPower announced the supply of 70 MW of "concentrator cell assemblies" to the JV's first 50 MW production line in Inner Mongolia for the first of two projects totaling 120 MW to be completed by the end of 2015.

During the early 2015 completion of its Fort Churchill facility in the U.S.,  Apple announced its funding of another 40 MW of the JV's LCPV projects in China to support of its growing operations there with renewable energy. The JV was reported to have ramped to three 50 MW production lines at that time.  Apple, SunPower, and Zhonghuan Energy (TZS's project development entity) indicated later in 2015 their intention to construct and jointly own an additional 170 MW of LCPV projects in northern China.

In August 2020, SunPower completed a split of its proprietary cell manufacturing and sales business into a separate company Maxeon Solar Technologies (NASDAQ:MAXN).  TZS invested $298 million in the new entity and maintains close ties.  Maxeon continues to manufacture and sell solar panel technology under the SunPower brand outside of the US and Canada.

See also

 Boulder Solar
 Solar power in Nevada
 Solar power in the United States

External links
 VIDEO: SunPower C7 Tracker Promo

References

Buildings and structures in Lyon County, Nevada
Solar power stations in Nevada
Photovoltaic power stations in the United States
Energy infrastructure completed in 2015